Jamie Gullan (born 2 July 1999) is a Scottish footballer who plays as a striker for Scottish Championship club Raith Rovers. Gullan has previously played for Hibernian, where he spent loan spells with Gala Fairydean Rovers, Queen's Park and Raith Rovers.

Career

Hibernian
Gullan was in the Heart of Midlothian youth system, but was released and he then signed with Hibernian. During the 2017–18 season he played for the Hibs development team, and he was also loaned to Gala Fairydean Rovers and Queen's Park He scored one of the goals as Hibs won the 2017–18 Scottish Youth Cup final against Aberdeen.

He made his first team debut for Hibernian in July 2018, in a 2018–19 UEFA Europa League qualifier against Faroese club NSI Runavik. In February 2019, Gullan was loaned to Scottish League One club Raith Rovers. Gullan scored his first goal for Raith on 7 May 2019, in a playoff match against Forfar Athletic. He returned to Raith on loan in August 2019. Gullan scored nine goals for Raith during this second spell, which helped to put them top of the 2019–20 Scottish League One table in early January. The clubs agreed to extend the loan by one week during January 2020.

Gullan returned to Hibs for the second part of the 2019–20 season, acting as cover for Christian Doidge and Marc McNulty. Gullan scored his first goal for Hibs on 28 February 2020, the fifth goal of a 5–2 win against Inverness CT in a Scottish Cup quarter-final.

On 1 February 2021, Gullan joined Raith Rovers on loan until the end of the season. He scored two of the goals in a 5–1 Fife derby win against Dunfermline on 30 March.

On 22 August 2021, Gullan made his first competitive appearance back at Hibernian following his loan spell with Raith Rovers, he came off the bench in the game which saw Hibernian draw 2–2 with Dundee away from home.

Raith Rovers
On 6 January 2022, Gullan signed for Raith Rovers permanently on a two and a half year deal for an undisclosed fee.

Career statistics

References

External links

1999 births
Living people
Scottish footballers
Hibernian F.C. players
Gala Fairydean Rovers F.C. players
Queen's Park F.C. players
Scottish Professional Football League players
Heart of Midlothian F.C. players
Association football midfielders
Place of birth missing (living people)
Raith Rovers F.C. players
Association football forwards